Walter Rea may refer to:

 Walter Rea, 1st Baron Rea (1873–1948), British merchant banker and Liberal politician
 Walter T. Rea (1922–2014), Seventh-day Adventist
 Walter B. Rea (1898–1970), American university administrator and basketball player